Remsen is a village in Oneida County, New York, United States. The population was 508 at the 2010 census.

The Village of Remsen is in the southwestern part of the Town of Remsen.

The Remsen Barn Festival of the Arts (FOTA) is held in late September. The first Barn Festival was in 1980. Thousands of visitors attend this yearly event on Main street.

The Mohawk, Adirondack and Northern Railroad (MHWA) Railroad crosses the town. The Adirondack Scenic Railroad utilizes the MHWA's trackage from Utica to just north of the village, diverting onto its own trackage (former NYC Adirondack Division)

History 
Oneida County was formed and Remsen Township was organized on March 15, 1798. The Village of Remsen was incorporated in 1845. Remsen Township was divided and the Town of Forestport was formed on November 24, 1869.

Geography
Remsen is located at  (43.327589, -75.186734).

According to the United States Census Bureau, the village has a total area of 0.4 square mile (1.0 km2), all land. Cincinnati Creek flows through the village from north to south.

Demographics

At the 2000 census, there were 531 people, 202 households and 136 families residing in the village. The population density was 1,431.9 per square mile (554.1/km2). There were 229 housing units at an average density of 617.5 per square mile (239.0/km2). The racial makeup of the village was 97.18% White, 0.75% Black or African American, 0.19% Native American, 0.75% Asian, and 1.13% from two or more races. Hispanic or Latino of any race were 0.19% of the population.

There were 202 households, of which 36.1% had children under the age of 18 living with them, 49.0% were married couples living together, 15.8% had a female householder with no male present, and 32.2% were non-families. 24.3% of all households were made up of individuals, and 10.4% had someone living alone who was 65 years of age or older. The average household size was 2.63 and the average family size was 3.12.

27.7% of the population were under the age of 18, 12.2% from 18 to 24, 27.9% from 25 to 44, 22.6% from 45 to 64, and 9.6% who were 65 years of age or older. The median age was 32 years. For every 100 females, there were 88.3 males. For every 100 females age 18 and over, there were 94.9 males.

The median household income was $29,485 and the median family income was $32,625. Males had a median income of $27,083 versus $23,750 for females. The per capita income for the village was $12,625. About 17.5% of families and 19.0% of the population were below the poverty line, including 22.1% of those under age 18 and 13.7% of those age 65 or over.

References

External links
 Village of Remsen, NY
 RW&O Railroad, Remsen, NY

Villages in New York (state)
Utica–Rome metropolitan area
Villages in Oneida County, New York
Welsh-American culture in New York (state)